Dariole is a French term meaning a small culinary mold in the shape of a truncated cone. The word also refers to the dessert that is baked in the mold. Classically, the dessert is an egg-custard filled puff pastry, but an early 20th century recipe replaces the traditional custard with liquor-laced frangipane.

Today there are also savory darioles, usually made with vegetable custards. These were also cooked as dessert in the Middle Ages and sometimes they included fruit, cheese, bone marrow or fish inside the pastry. They were very popular in the Middle Ages.

History
According to the fourteenth-century household book,  Le Ménagier de Paris, which doesn't include a recipe for the dessert, darioles were served at weddings. Recipes from later English records and the 1486 edition of  Le Viandier are unclear. A 15th century Italian recipe for a large custard tart called dariola is known. By the 18th-century the dessert had taken the form of a small custard tart with fluted sides. In late 19th-century recipes the custard is elaborately flavored and scented with citron, orange flower water, and vanilla sugar. The recipe from Larousse gastronomique filled the pastry with liquor-laced frangipane instead of custard.

See also

 List of French desserts

References

French pastries
Almond dishes
Cuisine of Provence
Cookware and bakeware
Medieval cuisine
Puff pastry
Custard desserts
Italian pastries
English cuisine
Wedding food
Stuffed desserts